Diane Oliver (July 28, 1943 – May 1966) was a Black feminist American writer. She published four short stories in her lifetime and two posthumously, all based on her experiences growing up in Charlotte, North Carolina's Black middle class in the 1940s and 1950s.

Early life and education 
Diane Oliver was born on July 28, 1943, in Charlotte, North Carolina.  Her father, William Oliver, was a schoolteacher and her mother, Blanche Rann; was a piano teacher. Diane attended segregated schools in Charlotte, graduating from West Charlotte High School in 1960 and the University of North Carolina at Greensboro (then known as Woman's College of the University of North Carolina) in 1964. She was matriculated to University of Iowa's Writers' Workshop in 1965.

Published works 
Oliver published four short stories in her lifetime and two more posthumously: “Key to the City” and “Neighbors,” published in The Sewanee Review in 1966; "Health Service," "Traffic Jam," and "Mint Juleps Not Served Here," published in Negro Digest in November 1965, July 1966, and March 1967, respectively; and "The Closet on the Top Floor," published in a 1966 fiction anthology.

Death 
Oliver died in a car accident in May 1966 in Iowa City, Iowa. The University of Iowa conferred her Master of Fine Arts degree posthumously on May 21, 1966.

References 

1943 births
1966 deaths
20th-century African-American women writers
20th-century African-American writers
20th-century American women writers
Iowa Writers' Workshop alumni